The Chopin Manuscript is a collaboration by 15 thriller writers created by Jeffery Deaver.  It is a 17-part serial thriller narrated by Alfred Molina that was originally broadcast weekly on Audible.com from 25 September 2007 to 13 November 2007.  It is now available in other formats than audiobook.

The book was followed by a sequel called The Copper Bracelet in 2009.

Authors
Listed in chapter order: 
 Jeffery Deaver (wrote both first and last chapters)
 David Hewson 
 James Grady 
 S. J. Rozan
 Erica Spindler 
 John Ramsey Miller 
 David Corbett
 John Gilstrap 
 Joseph Finder 
 Jim Fusilli 
 Peter Spiegelman 
 Ralph Pezzullo 
 Lisa Scottoline 
 P. J. Parrish 
 Lee Child

Awards
2008 "Audie Award" for Audiobook of the Year — Audio Publishers Association

References

2007 American novels
Audiobooks
American thriller novels
Collaborative fiction